Ololygon perpusilla is a species of frog in the family Hylidae.
It is endemic to Brazil.
Its natural habitats are subtropical or tropical moist lowland forests and subtropical or tropical moist shrubland.
It is threatened by habitat loss.

References

perpusilla
Amphibians of Brazil
Endemic fauna of Brazil
Taxa named by Adolfo Lutz
Taxa named by Bertha Lutz
Amphibians described in 1939
Taxonomy articles created by Polbot